Dirranbandi Airport  is an airport serving Dirranbandi, Queensland, Australia.

It is operated by the Balonne Shire Council. It has a  sealed runway with lights.

See also
 List of airports in Queensland

References

Airports in Queensland
South West Queensland